Castleman Run is a  long 3rd order tributary to Buffalo Creek in Brooke County, West Virginia.  This is the only stream of this name in the United States.  Castleman Run Lake, an impoundment of this stream, is protected as Castleman Run Lake Wildlife Management Area by the State of West Virginia.

Variant names
According to the Geographic Names Information System, it has also been known historically as:
Castleman's Run
Castlemans Run
Castlemens Run

Course
Castleman Run rises about 1 mile north of West Alexander, Pennsylvania, in Washington County and then flows northwest into West Virginia and Ohio County and then Brooke County to join Buffalo Creek at Bethany, West Virginia.

Watershed
Castleman Run drains  of area, receives about 40.5 in/year of precipitation, has a wetness index of 299.39, and is about 66% forested.

See also
List of rivers of West Virginia

References

Rivers of West Virginia
Rivers of Pennsylvania
Rivers of Washington County, Pennsylvania
Rivers of Brooke County, West Virginia
Rivers of Ohio County, West Virginia